Caleb Mwangangi Ndiku (born 9 October 1992 in Machakos) is a Kenyan middle- and long-distance runner.

Career
Born in Machakos, he was the son of a javelin thrower, David Ndiku, but he decided not to follow his father and focused on running instead. He began his career in domestic cross country running competitions and at the Athletics Kenya series meeting in Meru, he took fifth place in the junior men's race at the age of sixteen. He won selection for the 2009 World Youth Championships in Athletics with a personal best run in the 1500 metres at the Kenyan youth trials. At the championships in Brixen, he ran 3:38.42 to win the silver medal behind compatriot Gideon Kiage Mageka. Ndiku returned to the Kenyan cross country circuit at the end of the year, and finished fourth at another Athletics Kenya series race in Nairobi.

Ndiku earned himself a place on the Kenyan junior men's team for the 2010 IAAF World Cross Country Championships with a third-place finish in the junior race at the Kenya National Cross Country Championships. In the world junior men's race in Bydgoszcz the following month, he formed part of the leading pack before quickening the pace to establish a significant lead. He won the junior title and also headed the Kenyan runners to the team gold as the country grabbed the top four spots. Ndiku took his second title of the year at the 2010 World Junior Championships in Athletics, where he ran a personal best of 3:37.30 minutes to win the 1500 m world junior crown. He won the Most Promising Kenyan Sportsman of the Year award at the end that December.

In 2011 he started his technical collaboration with the Italian coach Renato Canova, who planned for him a strategy looking at 5000m.

He began competing in senior competitions the following year and was runner-up at the Trofeo Alasport cross country in March, second only to the newly elected world champion Imane Merga.

In 2014 he had a very impressive season, winning everything possible : World Indoor Championships in 3000m, Commonwealth Games (27 July) in 5000m, African Championships (14 August) in 5000m, the Diamond League in 5000m (with two victories in Eugene and Zurich), and the Continental Cup in 3000m (14 September), becoming the number one of 5000m for the ranking of Track and Field.

Competition record

1Representing Africa

References

External links
 

1992 births
Living people
People from Machakos County
Kenyan male long-distance runners
Kenyan male middle-distance runners
Kenyan male cross country runners
Olympic athletes of Kenya
Athletes (track and field) at the 2016 Summer Olympics
Commonwealth Games medallists in athletics
Commonwealth Games gold medallists for Kenya
Athletes (track and field) at the 2014 Commonwealth Games
World Athletics Championships athletes for Kenya
World Athletics Championships medalists
African Games gold medalists for Kenya
African Games medalists in athletics (track and field)
Athletes (track and field) at the 2011 All-Africa Games
Diamond League winners
World Athletics Indoor Championships winners
IAAF Continental Cup winners
21st-century Kenyan people
Medallists at the 2014 Commonwealth Games